The 1997 O'Byrne Cup was a Gaelic football competition played by the county teams of Leinster GAA.

The tournament was a straight knockout, with 12 teams.

Offaly were the winners, defeating Wexford in the final at O'Connor Park.

Results

References

O'Byrne Cup
O'Byrne Cup